"Where I'm From" is a song by Danish pop and soul band Lukas Graham, featuring American rapper, singer and songwriter Wiz Khalifa. It was released as a digital download and for streaming on 5 November 2020 by Warner Records. The song was written by Brandon O'Bryant Beal, Cameron Thomaz, Dijon McFarlane, Henrik Bryld Wolsing, Lukas Forchhammer, Morten Ristorp and Stefan Forrest.

Background
The song was written for documentary 7 Years of Lukas Graham, which premiered in Denmark on 5 November 2020. Talking about the song, Lukas said, "It's a song about remembering your roots without losing sight of where you wanna go. Growth is a necessary component in life if you want to be happy, and growth comes in many shapes and forms, most of them personal. I've traveled a long way already but I still live a few blocks away from where I grew up. My point is, that you can grow and move light years and still stay put. It's all about perception and attitude. Usually, to make something good out of something bad, all I need to do is change those two things. My perception and it my attitude. And the attitude we've had as a team has brought us far enough from home to work with legends like DJ Mustard and Wiz Khalifa. I'm stoked to have a song out with them and super proud of the work each of us have put into it."

Credits and personnel
Credits adapted from Tidal.
 Hennedub – producer
 Mustard – producer
 Henrik Bryld Wolsing – bass, drum programmer, keyboards, vocal production, writer
 Rissi – co-producer
 Wiz Khalifa – featured artist, vocals
 Chris Gehringer – mastering
 Mark "Spike" Stent – mixing
 Morten Ristorp – piano, vocal production, writer
 Brandon O'Bryant Beal – vocal recording engineer, writer
 Eric Dan – vocal recording engineer
 Lukas Graham – vocals
 Cameron Thomaz – writer
 Dijon McFarlane – writer
 Lukas Forchhammer – writer
 Stefan Forrest – writer

Charts

Release history

References

2020 singles
2020 songs
Wiz Khalifa songs
Lukas Graham songs
Warner Records singles